St Mary's Church is a redundant Anglican church in the hamlet of Lambourn Woodlands in the English county of Berkshire. It is recorded in the National Heritage List for England as a designated Grade II listed building, and is under the care of the Churches Conservation Trust.

History

The church was built in 1852 and designed by the architect Thomas Talbot Bury, a pupil of Augustus Charles Pugin, in Gothic Revival style.  It was declared redundant on 1 June 1990, and was vested in the Churches Conservation Trust on 24 July 1991.

Architecture

St Mary's is constructed in flint with stone dressings, and has slate roofs.  Its plan is simple, consisting of a three-bay nave, a north aisle and a chancel.  To the north of the west end is an octagonal spire.  There are three two-light windows in Decorated style, and a three-light east window.

Inside the church is a three-bay arcade carried on octagonal piers.  The chancel contains a sedilia and a piscina.  The reredos was carved by John Bacon, whose son was the first parish priest.

See also
List of churches preserved by the Churches Conservation Trust in South East England

References

External links
Photographs of the exterior

Grade II listed churches in Berkshire
Church of England church buildings in Berkshire
Churches completed in 1852
Gothic Revival church buildings in England
Gothic Revival architecture in Berkshire
Churches preserved by the Churches Conservation Trust
19th-century Church of England church buildings
1852 establishments in England
St Mary's Church, Lambourn Woodlands